Guy Dynevor Thornton (born Guy Dinevor Thornton; 11 August 1872 – 13 June 1934) was a notable New Zealand evangelist, army chaplain, and writer. He was born in Wotton-under-Edge, Gloucestershire, England, in 1872.

References

1872 births
1934 deaths
New Zealand military personnel
New Zealand evangelical leaders
English emigrants to New Zealand
New Zealand writers